The X Corps of the Grande Armée was a French military unit that existed during the Napoleonic Wars. The corps was first formed in 1807 and placed under the command of Marshal François Joseph Lefebvre. The corps was responsible for bringing the Siege of Danzig to a successful conclusion. During the French invasion of Russia in 1812, the corps was reconstituted and Marshal Jacques MacDonald appointed to lead it. The corps contained a Prussian contingent that went on to form the core of the reformed Prussian Army in 1813. Following the retreat from Russia, the X Corps was given the assignment of holding Danzig under the leadership of General Jean Rapp. The Siege of Danzig lasted from January until November 1813 when the garrison surrendered.

Order of battle

Russia, 1812
Corps Commander: Maréchal de France Jacques-Étienne Macdonald, duc de Tarente
Chief of Staff: Adjudant-commandant Jacques Terrier
Chief, Artillery: General de division Albert-L.-V. Taviel
Chief, Engineers: General de division Jacques-D.-M. de Campredon, Chef de bataillon Jean Marion de Beaulieu
Aide-de-camp: Chef d'escadron Seguier, Capitaine Garola, Capitaine Jules J.-G. de Tamney, Capitaine M. de Beurnonville

7th Division
Commander: General de division Charles Louis Dieudonné Grandjean
Chief of Staff : Plk. Jozef Nowicki
Chief, Artillery : Chief d'batallion Farjon
Adjutant: Capt. Louis Chapuis
Chief, Engineers : Capt. 1er cl. Roger-P-M-A de Riencourt
Inspecteur aux revues : S.-ins. aux r. Reybaud (Rayband)
Aides de Camp: Chief d'batallion Theodore Meynier, Capitain Perrin (Perin), Lt. Maisonneuve

1st Brigade
Commander: General de brigade Étienne Pierre Sylvestre Ricard

5th Polish Line Regt. Plk. Stefan Oskierko
1st Battalion: CdB Ludwik Kaminski
2nd Battalion: CdB Jan Godlewski
3rd Battalion: CdB Feliks Stokowski
4th Battalion: N. (not present)
Regt Artillery: Kapt. Ignacy Kulesza

13th Bavarian Line Regt.: Obst. Franz Baron Schlossberg
1st Battalion: Major Caspar Poyk (Poeck)
2nd Battalion: Major Franz v. Pillement
1st Section, 2nd Bavarian 6 lb. Battery: Untlt. Alois Escher(t) II.

2nd Brigade
Commander: General brygady ksiaze Michal Radziwill
 Aide-de-Camp: Kpt. Antoni Niesiolowski

10th Polish Line Regt.: Plk. Henryk Kamienski
1st Battalion: CdB Jan Krassin (Crassin, Krassyn)
2nd Battalion: CdB Franciszek Czyzewski
3rd Battalion: Nicolas-Joseph (Mikolaj) Daine
4th Battalion: N. (not present)
Regt. Artillery: Kapt. Leneke

3rd Brigade
Commander: General de brigade Gilbert Bachelu

11th Polish Line Regt.: Plk. Aleksander Chlebowski
1st Battalion: CdB Piotr Tzembeck (Szembeck)
2nd Battalion: CdB Kazimierz Poniatowski
3rd Battalion: CdB Karol Jon(n)emann
4th Battalion: N. (not present)
Regt. Artillery: Kapt. Ostrowski

1st Westphalian Line Regt. Col. Georg Ferdinand v. Plessmann
1st Battalion: C. de bat. Johann Philipp Bauer
2nd Battalion: Capt. (later c. de bat.) David v. Kruse
Regt. Artillery: Kapt. v. Haustein

Division (Prussian) Cavalry (detached from 27th Division)
Commander: Obst. Karl F. v. Hunerbein

1st Prussian Combined Hussar Regt.: Major Dietrich C. G. v. Cosel
1st Leib-Hussaren Regt.:
3rd Sqdrn.: Rittm. Karl L. F. Dallmer
4th Sqdrn.: Rittm. Meyer
2nd Leib-Hussaren Regt.:
2nd Sqdrn.: Maj. v. Kurnatowsky.
3rd Sqdrn.: Rittm. Karl L. Zastrow

Division Artillery and Engineers
6th Polish Foot Comp.: Kpt. Turdeski
1st Polish Horse Comp.: Kpt. Wladyslaw Tomasz Ostrowski
Garde d'Artie. Polonaise: (detachment)
4th Polish Sapper Company: Kpt. Jozef Dobrzyński

Division Train
12th Battalion (a l'allemande):
6th Train Company: S.-lieutenant Benoist (?)

27th (Prussian) Infantry Division
Commander, Prussian Mobile Corps: Gen. der Inf. Julius von Grawert
2nd in Command: Gen.-Lieut. Hans David Ludwig Yorck
Chief of Staff : Oberst Friedrich E. v. Roeder
Quartermaster: Obstlt. Johann F. K. v. Lossau (Genstab.)
Chief Engineer : Maj. Markoff
Adjutants: Maj. Anton F. F. v. Seydlitz, Pr.-Lieut. Friedrich Aug. Karl v. Brandenstein (Genstab.),  Maj. Johann Alexander v. Traubenfeld (Genstab.), Kapt. Wilhelm K. v. Schack (Genstab.), Pr.-Lieut. Lollhofel v. Lowensprung (Genstab.)

Commander, Prussian Infantry:  Gen.-Maj. Friedrich Graf Kleist von Nollendorf
Chief of Staff: Maj. Ernest H. W. v. Perbandt (Genstab.)
Adjutants: Maj. Johann F. W. v. Schon, Maj. Heinrich A. E. v. Thile II (Genstab.), Sec.-Lt. v. Rudiger (aggr. zum Genstab.)

Commander, Prussian Cavalry: Gen.-Lt. Friedrich E. v. Massenbach
Adjutants: Maj. Ludwig E. C. v. Kyckpusch (Genstab.)

1st Brigade
Commander: Obst. Hans Franz v. Below
Adjutant: Stabs-Kapit. v. Drygalski

Inft. Regt. Nr. 1: Maj. Friedrich Wilhelm v. Sjoholm I (2nd Opr. Inft. Regt.)
Fus. Bat, 1st Opr Inft. Regt.: Maj. Christoph J. H. v. Erammon.
I Bat, 2nd. Opr. Inft. Regt.: Maj. Ludwig v. Krauthof.
II Bat, 1st Opr. Inft. Regt.: Maj. Carl v. Kurnatowsky

Inft. Regt. Nr. 2: Maj. Ludwig F. v. Sjoholm II (3rd Opr. Inft. Regt.)
Fus. Bat, 4th Opr. Inft. Regt.: Maj. Johann F. v. Pfeiffer
I Bat, 4th Opr. Inft. Regt.: Maj. v. Lubtow
I Bat, 3rd Opr. Inft. Regt.: Maj. Karl R. W. v. Beckedorff

Fus. Bat. Nr. 7:
Fus. Bat, 2nd Opr. Inft. Regt.: Maj. Friedrich W. v. Funck

2nd Brigade
Commander: Obstlt. Heinrich Wilh. v. Horn
Adjutant: St. Kapt. August W. Graf Kanitz

Inft. Regt. Nr. 3: Maj. Karl F. F. v. Steinmetz (Colb. Inft. Regt.)
Fus. Bat, 1st Pom. Inft. Regt.: Maj. August Ferdinand v. Borcke
I Bat, Colb. Inft. Regt.: Maj. Friedrich W. v. Quednow
II Bat, 1st Pomm. Inft. Regt.: Maj. Carl Ludwig Frhr. v. Linsingen

Inft. Regt. Nr. 4: Maj. v. Tippelskirch
Fus. Bat, Leib-Regt.: Maj. August Heinrich v. Reuss
I Bat, Leib-Regt.: Maj. Konstantin G. L. v. Zepelin and Maj. Friedrich Christoph v. Oertzen
II Bat, Leib-Regt.: Maj. Julius Gustav Friedrich v. Both

3rd Brigade
Commander: Oberst Eugen v. Raumer
Adjutant: Maj. v. Collrepp

Inft. Regt. Nr. 5: Maj. Ludwig D. K. v. Schmalensee
Fus. Bat, 2nd Wpr. Inft. Regt.: Maj. Julius L. v. Rudolphi, Maj. Georg W. v Lettow
I Bat, 1st Wpr. Inft. Regt.: Maj. v. Imbrecht
I Bat, 2nd Wpr. Inft. Regt.: Maj. Friedrich E. v. Loebell

Inft. Regt. Nr. 6: Maj. Arwed K. v. Carnall
Fus. Bat, 2nd Sch. Inft. Regt.: Maj. Karl G. S. v. Lessel
II Bat, 2nd Sch. Inft. Regt.: Maj. Karl Heinriich v. Ziemietzi 
II Bat, 1st Sch. Inft. Regt.: Maj. v. Happe
Ostprussian Jäger Bat.: Maj. Vollmar K. F. v. Clausewitz
1st Battery, Prussian Arty. Brigade: Uffz. Staffehl (one 3-lbr)

1st Cavalry Brigade  
Commander: Obst. Wilhelm Jeannert

1st Combined Dragoner-Regt.: Maj. Karl Alexander Wilhelm von Treskow 
Litth. Dragoner-Regt.:
2nd Sqdrn.: Maj. v. Kameke
4th Sqdrn.: St. Rittm. Dresler
2nd Westpr. Dragoner-Regt.: Maj. Ernst T. v. Eicke
1st Sqdrn.: Maj. v. Manstein
2nd Sqdrn.: Maj. Friedrich Frhr. v. Stiern

2nd Combined Dragoner-Regt.Obstlt. Alexander G. L. M. M. v. Wahlen-Jürgass
1st Westpr. Dragoner-Regt.:
1st Sqdrn.: Rittm. Karl Weiss
3rd Sqdrn.: Rittm. Ernst L. B. v. Printz
 
3rd Combined Hussaren-Regt.: Maj. Ernest T. v. Eicke 
1st. Schles. Hussaren-Regt.:
1st Sqdrn.: St. Rittm. Friedrich A. Kehler
3rd Sqdrn.: St. Rittm. Muller
2nd Schles. Hussaren-Regt.:
1st Sqdrn.: Maj. Johann H. v. Schill
2nd Sqdrn.:

(Prussian) Corps Artillery 
Commander: Major Johann H. v. Schmidt

Foot Artillery: Maj. Joh. Friedr. v. Fiebig I.
Foot Battery No. 1 (6 lb): Pr.-Kapit. Huet 
Foot Battery No. 2(6 lb): Stabs-Kapit. Wegner 
Foot Battery No. 3(6 lb): Stabs-Kapit. Ziegler 
Foot Battery No. 4(6 lb): Pr.-Kapit. Ludwig 
half Battery(12 lb): Pr.-Kapit. v. Roszynski

Horse Artillery: Maj. Gustav v. Fiebig II.
1st Horse Battery: Stabs-Kapit. Johann K. L. v. Zincken 
2nd Horse Battery: Pr.-Kapit. Georg W. v. Rentzell 
3rd Horse Battery: Pr. Kapit. v. Graumann

Artillery Park:
Park (Munitions) columns:
No. 1 Sec.-Lieut. Schliew
No. 2 Sec.-Lieut. Herrmann
No. 3 Prem.-Lieut. Barenkampff
No. 4 Pr.-Kapit. Meyer (4th Ft. Comp., Pr. Brig.)
No. 5 Sec.-Lieut. v. Hertig I (Brand) (8th Ft. Comp., Brand. Brig.)

Bridging Column:
Handwerk Columns: Sec.-Lieut. Lieben (2nd Ft. Btry.)
No. 1:
No. 2:

Corps Train
Miners:
1st Battalion:
3rd Company:
5th Company:
2nd Battalion:
1st Company:

Sappers:
1st Battalion:
Sapeurs de I'ile d'Elbe:
1st Company:
2nd Company:
Prussian Sappers: (2 companies):

Marine Bataillion d'ouviers de l'Escaut:

17th equipage de flottille:

References

Recommended reading

 Akademja Umiejetnosci, Kraków. Polski Slownik Biograficzny. Kraków, 1935-.
 Allgemeine Deutsche Biographie. 56 vols. Leipzig, 1875-1912.
 Almanach Royal de Wesphalie. Cassel, 1812-1813.
 Almanach Imperial. 1812-13. Paris, 1812-13.
 Auriol, Charles. "Retraite du 10e Corps de la Grande-Armée de la Dwina sur Dantzig (1812), Documents Inedits". In La Spectateur Militaire. Vol. 42. Paris, 1888. pp. 226–296.
 Baltische Monatsschrift. 1910-1912.
 Beihefte zum Militar-Wochenblatt. Nr. 8-9. Berlin, 1894. pp. 268–298.
 Bogdanovich, Modest I. Istoriia Otechestvennoi voiny 1812 goda. 3 vols. Spb., 1859-60.
 Charbanier, Jean. "La Grande Armée en Lithuanie et en Courland". In Revue Historique de l'Armée. No. 2, 1973. pp. 29–47.
 Chelminski, Jan and A. Malibran. L'Armee du Duché de Varsovie. Paris, 1913.
 Costantini, A. "Le Marechal Macdonald, Chef du 10e Corps Juin 1812 - Janvier 1813". In Revue Historique de l'Armée. No. 2, 1971. pp. 58–78.
 Dziennik dzialan wojennych 7 dywizji (gdanskiej) w 1812 r. Edited by Janusz Staszewskii. In Rocznik Gdanski Vol. 11. Gdańsk, 1937.
 Defense de Dantzig en 1813 : Journal de Siege : Journal Personnel et Notes du General du Division de Campredon Commandant le Genie du Xe Corps : Lettres Diverses / annotés et publiés par Charles Auriol.@ Paris, 1888.
 Droysen. Das Leben des Feldmarschalls Grafen York von Wartenberg. 2 vols. Leipzig, 1913.
 Eckardt. York und Paulucci. Aktenstucke und Beitrage zur Geschichte der Convention von Tauroggen. Leipzig, 1865.
 Fabry, Gabriel Joseph. Campagne de 1812, Documents Relatifs a l'Aile Gauche 20 Août - 4 Decembre. Paris, 1912.
 Fabry, Gabriel Joseph. Campagne de Russie, 1812. 5 vols. Paris, 1900-03.
 Hartwich, Julius von. 1812. Der Feldzug in Kurland. Nach den Tagbuchern und Briefen des Leutnants Julius v. Hartwich zusammengestellt von Rugiger v. Schoeler. Berlin, 1910.
 Gembarzewski, Bronislav. Wojska Polskie, Ksiestwo Warszawskie 1807-1814. Warsaw, 1912.
 Kirkor, Stanislaw. Pod Sztandarami Napoleona. London, 1982.
 Kreuzwendedich von der Borne. Geschichte des Infanterie-Regiments Prinz Louis Ferdinand v. Preussen, 2. Magdeburgisches Nr 27 von 1815-1895. Berlin, 1896.
 Lossberg, Friedrich Wilhelm von. Briefe in die Heimat. Cassel, 1844.
 Loza, Stanislaw. Legia Honorowa w Polsce 1803-1923. Zamość, 1923.
 Lunsmann, Fritz. Die Armee des Koniglichs Westfalen 1807-1813. Berlin, 1935.
 Marco de Saint-Hilaire, Emile. Histoire de la Campagne de Russie pendant l'Annee 1812.... 2 vols. Paris, [1846-1848].
 Margueron, Cmdt. Campagne de Russie. 3 vols. in 4. Paris, n.d.
 Martinien, A. Tableaux par corps et par batailles des officiers tues et blesses pedant les guerres de l'Empire (1805–1815). Reprint edition.. Paris, Editions Militaires Europeennes, S.d.
 Nafziger, George et al. Poles and Saxons of the Napoleonic Wars. Chicago, 1991.
 Nekrolog of Georg Plessmann in "Frankfurther patriotisches Wochenblatt ...." Nro. 10, 1817.
 Ostrowski, Ant. Zywot Thomasza Ostrowskiego. vol. 1. Lvov, 1872.
 Otechestvennaia voina 1812 goda. Part I, 21 volumes (in 22); Part II, 1 volume. St.-Petersburg, Tipografia ABerezhlivost, 1900-1914. The first 7 volumes of Part I were translated into French by E. Cazalas and published, at the direction of the Section Historique of the French General Staff, under the title ALa guerre nationale de 1812", beginning in 1902.
 Polotsko-vitebskaia starina. Vitebsk, 1911-1916.
 Poniatowski, Jozef, prince. Korrespondencya ksiecia Jozefa Poniatowskiego z Francya. 5 vols. Poznań, 1921-29.
 Das Preussische Heer der Befreiungskriege. Vol.1. Berlin, 1912. Reprint edition, 1982.
 Priesdorf, Kurt von. Soldatisches Fuhrertum. 10 vols. Hamburg, 1936-45.
 Quintin, Danielle et Bernard. Dictionnaire de Colonels de Napoleon. 1996. S.P.M., Paris.
 Rangliste der Koniglich Bayerischen Armee fur das Jahr 1811. Neudruch der Ausgabe 1811. Osnabrück, 1982.
 Rang- und Quartierliste der Preussischen Armee von 1812. Unveranderter Faksimiledruck mit einer Einleitung von Werner Hahlweg. Osnabrück, 1968.
 Rousset, Camille, editor. Souvenirs du Marechal Macdonald, duc de Tarente. Paris, 1892.
 Schoning, Kurd Wolfgang v. Historisch-biographische Nachrichten zur Geschichte der Brandenburgisch-Preussischen Artillerie. Vol. 3. Berlin, 1845.
 Schubert, Franz and Hans Vara. Geschichte des K. B. 13. Infanterie-Regiments Kaiser Franz Joseph von Osterreich. Vol 1. Munich, 1910.
 Seraphim. Der Feldzeug in Kurland 1812. Riga, 1910.
 Seydlitz. Tagebuch des K. Preussischen Armeecorps im Feldzuge 1812. Berlin, 1823.
 "10e Corps d'Armee - Situation au 20. Juin 1812" in Marshal Davout's archive at the S. H. A. T.
 Six, Georges. Dictionnaire Biographique des Généraux & Admiraux Français de la Revolution et de l'Empire (1792–1814). 2 volumes. Reprint edition. Paris, Georges Saffroy, 1974.
 Stalins, Jean-Luc. Ordre Imperial de la Reunion. Paris, 1958.
 Strotha, von. Die Koniglich Preussische Reitende Artillerie vom Jahre 1759 bis 1816. Berlin, 1861. Reprint edition Wiesbaden, 1981.
 Staszewski, Janusz. "Dywizja gdanska w walkach nad Dzwina i w obronie Gdanska (1812–13)". In Rocznik Gdanski Vol. 11. Gdańsk, 1933-34.
 Staszewski, Janusz. "Z dziejow garizonu polskiego w Gdansku w latach 1808-1812". In ARocznik Gdanski Vol. 7/8. Gdańsk, 1937.
 "Die Theilnahme des Preussischen Hulfscorps an dem Feldzuge gegen Russland im Jahre 1812". In Kriegsgeschichtliche Einzelschriften Vol. 4, Heft 24. Berlin, 1898. Pp. vii, 433-566, 5 folding maps.
 Voenno-istoricheskii sbornik. Spb., 1911-16.
 Voigt, Gunter. Deutschlands Heere bis 1918. Ursprung und Entwicklung der eizelnen Formationen. Vol 1 - Die Garde- und die Grenadier-Regimenter 1-12 der preussoischen Armee. Osnabrück, 1980.
 Wesolowski, Zdzislaw P. The Order of the Virtuti Militari and its Cavaliers 1792-1992 (sic)... Miami, 1992.
 Zych, Gabriel. Armia Ksiestwa Warszawskiego 1807-1812. Warsaw, 1961.

GAI10